Dicerca punctulata is a species of metallic wood-boring beetle in the family Buprestidae. It is found in North America.

References

Further reading

 
 
 

Buprestidae
Beetles of North America
Beetles described in 1817
Taxa named by Carl Johan Schönherr
Articles created by Qbugbot